Cibodas Botanical Garden (KRC) is a  botanical garden on the slopes of Mount Gede, located in the Cibodas subdistrict of West Java, Indonesia.  It was operated by the Indonesian Institute of Sciences (LIPI), which now has been transformed to National Research and Innovation Agency (BRIN).

History
The garden was founded in 1852 by the Dutch botanist Johannes Elias Teijsmann as a branch of the Bogor Botanical Gardens, and its layout was completed under Rudolph Scheffer in later years.

Overview

The gardens were built at a high altitude, allowing the growth of subtropical plants.

The gardens are the first place that Cinchona trees were grown in Indonesia for quinine production in 1854. The trees was originally brought to Java by Justus Carl Hasskarl from South America and was successfully experimented in the garden. Plants which are exotic to Indonesia, such as Eucalyptus from Australia, Conifers from Europe, and others are cultivated in the area.

Collection  

There are approximately 10,792 living specimens in the garden, including 320 orchids, 289 cacti, 22 succulent plants, 216 algae, 103 ferns, and 1162 garden plant species that live within the proximity of the botanic garden. Only 114 of the plant species present in the garden are native to West Java. Its herbarium contains approximately 4,852 preserved specimens of plants.

The collections are divided into outdoor and indoor sections. The indoor section houses plants within glasshouses, including cacti and orchids. The outdoor section is divided into a sakura garden, algae garden, rhododendron garden, fern garden, and medicine garden.

In April 2014, the botanic garden opened a new section, the House of Nepenthes, containing 55 species and 47 hybrid species of nepenthes.

Cibodas Bryophyte Park
The Cibodas bryophyte park, or Taman Lumut Cibodas, is part of the Cibodas Botanical Garden and is located between Mount Gede and Mount Gede Pangrango National Park. It was built in 2004 and opened to the public officially on April 11, 2006, on the occasion of the 154th anniversary of the Cibodas Botanical Gardens. The 1,500 m2 garden was designed to resemble the natural habitat of mosses. Natural shade is also provided by the shade of native Indonesian plants that grow around it to give the desired humid conditions.

Gallery

See also

List of botanical gardens

References

External links 
 Guide to Cibodas Botanic Garden

Botanical gardens in Indonesia
Geography of West Java
Tourist attractions in West Java